The Santa Fe Desert Chorale is a 24-voice professional choir in Santa Fe, New Mexico which was founded in 1982.

History 

The Santa Fe Desert Chorale was founded in 1982 by artistic director Lawrence Bandfield. He chose Santa Fe with the belief that the city's artistic reputation would provide visibility to the group. Banfield led the Chorale until 1998.

From 1999 to 2004 the director was Dennis Shrock, who had previously been the choral director of the Oklahoma City Philharmonic.

In 2002 they started a year-round program for children (ages 7 to 14), which also holds public performances.

The Santa Fe Desert Chorale did not have a director for their 2008 Summer season, using four prospective directors, as well as three guest conductors. Since 2009, their official director has been Joshua Habermann, who was one of the four finalists tried during the 2008 season. Habermann also directs the Dallas Symphony Chorus.

During the Winter, 2011 season, the Chorale debuted a second group, named Desert Chorale II composed of students from the University of New Mexico, in addition to singers from the main group. Desert Chorale II was formed by Habermann as a means of providing training to singers outside of a university setting.

Organization 

The Desert Chorale holds general concerts during Summer, and holiday concerts in December. They have recorded 13 CDs.

The casting of the chorus changes yearly, with about two thirds returning on any given year. Habermann conducts auditions in New York, Los Angeles, and Dallas, while some musicians send recordings.

See also
 Santa Fe Chamber Music Festival

References

External links
 
 

American choirs
Culture of Santa Fe, New Mexico
Musical groups established in 1982
Tourist attractions in Santa Fe, New Mexico
1982 establishments in New Mexico
Musical groups from New Mexico